With Our King and Queen Through India (1912) is a British documentary. The film is silent and made in the Kinemacolor additive color process.

The film records the 12 December 1911 celebrations in India which marked the coronation of George V and Mary of Teck and their proclamation as Emperor and Empress of India. The film is often referred to as The Delhi Durbar or The Durbar at Delhi. Although it is commonly referred to as a single film, it is more accurate to think of it as a set of films documenting the royal visit to India in December 1911, with the Durbar ceremony as the centrepiece. Different showings of With Our King and Queen Through India would be made up of different sets of the films, so that the show (a more accurate concept) was exhibited in several different lengths. Today only two reels survive, one showing a review of troops after the main ceremony and the other a procession in Calcutta from the end of the royal tour.

Production
The film showcased the use of Kinemacolor, which had been launched by Charles Urban in 1908 as the first successful natural colour motion picture process. It was produced by Urban's Natural Color Kinematograph Company and he took five camera operators with him: Joseph De Frenes, Albuin Mariner, Alfred Gosden, Hiram Horton and an unidentified fifth (possibly John Mackenzie).

British filmmakers had previously filmed the Delhi Durbar marking the coronation of King Edward VII in 1903 (which Edward did not attend).

Release and reception
The films were premiered at the Scala Theatre, London on 2 February 1912, with an accompaniment provided by a live orchestra of forty-eight pieces, a chorus of twenty-four, a twenty-piece fife and drum corps, and three bagpipes. The music echoed that played at the actual ceremonies in Delhi. The stage set featured a mock-up of the Taj Mahal, and there were elaborate lighting effects. Live commentary was provided by the Scala's stage manager St John Hamund. An article in the American periodical Munsey's Magazine praised the music, describing the band as "one of the best I have heard in London".

The full show was made up of several sections, according to the 1912 Kinemacolor catalogue:

 Royal Visit to Bombay (2–4 December 1911)
 Scenes in Delhi, the New Capital of India
 Arrival of the Ruling Chiefs at Kingsway Station, Delhi
 Preparing for the Durbar - the Chiefs' Camps
 The Royal Horse Artillery Firing a Salute
 Arrival of Their Imperial Majesties at Selimgarh Station
 Arrival at the Reception Tent, Delhi Fort (7 December 1911)
 The State Entry into Delhi (7 December 1911)
 The Royal Procession passing from the Ridge to the King's Camp (Delhi, 7 December 1911)
 King Edward Memorial Ceremony (Delhi, 8 December 1911)
 Presentation of Colors (11 December 1911)
 The Delhi Polo Tournament (7 to 11 December 1911)
 THE CORONATION DURBAR AT DELHI (12 December 1911) 
 The State Garden Party at Delhi Fort (13 December 1911)
 The Royal Review of 50,000 Troops (Delhi, 14 December) [film survives]
 Point to Point Races (Delhi, December, 13th, 1911)
 State Departure of Their Imperial Majesties (Delhi, 16 December 1911)
 The King's Camp and the Chiefs' Receptions
 Preparations for the Calcutta Pageant
 Arrival and Reception of Their Imperial Majesties at Princep's Ghat Calcutta (30 December 1911)
 The Pageant Procession [film survives]
 Their Imperial Majesties' Departure from Calcutta (8 January 1912)

When the film was released, there had been several short black-and-white films of the Delhi Durbar made already by other companies. With Our King and Queen Through India made a huge impact worldwide because of its colour, length and multi-media spectacle. It had a great appeal for middle class audiences that had previously avoided film shows because of their low social status, and it was exhibited before royalty. George V saw it at the Scala on 11 May 1912, accompanied by Queen Mary, Queen Alexandra and Empress Maria of Russia. The Empress wrote to her son Nicholas II of Russia about the show.

We are lunching today with Georgie and May at Buckingham Palace. They both send you greetings. Last night we saw their journey to India. Kinemacolor is wonderfully interesting and very beautiful and gives one the impression of having seen it all in reality.

The films were also shown at Buckingham Palace on 12 December 1912.

One of the surviving sequences from the film, The Pageant Procession, has been released on the DVD set Kinemacolor and Other Magic.

See also
 List of early color feature films
 List of incomplete or partially lost films

References

External links
 
 Description of complete show with colour illustrations from 1912 Kinemacolor catalogue
 

1912 films
1910s color films
British silent feature films
British documentary films
1912 documentary films
Films shot in Delhi
Documentary films about British royalty
George V
Documentary films about India
Silent films in color
Articles containing video clips
Lost British films
1912 lost films
Early color films
1910s British films
Silent documentary films